Psittacanthus brasiliensis is a species of Neotropical mistletoe in the family Loranthaceae, which is endemic to Brazil.

Description
Psittacanthus brasiliensis has pendulous branches, which are circular in cross-section. The leaves are opposite and petiolate, with the leaf base being acute and the apex obtuse.  The position of the inflorescence is terminal and forms an umbel of triads on peduncles. Their colour is red and they have a straight style

Distribrution
It occurs in the southeast of Brazil (Minas Gerais, Rio de Janeiro, São Paulo).

Habitat
It grows in Atlantic forest and rain-forest.

Taxonomy
Psittacanthus brasiliensis was first described by Desrousseaux in 1792 as Loranthus brasiliensis, and in 1834, Don assigned it to the new genus Psittacanthus.

Etymology
Psittacanthos comes from the Greek psittakos (parrot), and the Greek anthos (flower), possibly chosen, according to Don, because of the bright colours.  The specific epithet, brasiliensis,  is the Latin for of Brazil (genitive singular case).

References

brasiliensis
Flora of Brazil
Taxa named by George Don